Härma is a village in Hiiumaa Parish, Hiiu County in northwestern Estonia.

The village is first mentioned in 1798 (Herma). Historically, the village was part of Emmaste Manor.

1977–1997 the village was part of Kaderna village.

References
 

Villages in Hiiu County